Avita may refer to:
Australian Green Tree Frog
Tretinoin